David Shor (born 1991) is an American data scientist and political consultant known for analyzing political polls. He serves as head of data science with Blue Rose Research in New York City, and is a senior fellow with the Center for American Progress Action Fund. Shor advised a number of liberal political action committees during the 2020 United States elections.

Early life 
Shor grew up in Miami, Florida, in a Sephardic Jewish family. He holds a mathematics degree from Florida International University. Shor was a precocious child and gifted in mathematics, starting his undergraduate degree at the age of 13 and finishing at the age of 17. Shor was awarded the Math in Moscow scholarship in fall 2009.

Career 
Shor joined the Barack Obama 2012 presidential campaign at the age of 20, working on the Chicago-based team that tracked internal and external polls and developed forecasts. The team Shor worked with developed a polling forecasting model, known as "The Golden Report", that projected Obama's vote share within one percentage point in eight of the nine battleground states. New York Magazine described Shor as the "in-house Nate Silver" of the Obama campaign.

Shor then worked as a senior data scientist with Civis Analytics in Chicago for seven years, where he operated the company's web-based survey. On May 28, 2020, Shor tweeted a summary of an academic study by Omar Wasow, a black political scientist at Princeton University, that argued riots following Martin Luther King Jr.'s assassination likely tipped the 1968 presidential election in Richard Nixon's favor. Some critics argued that Shor's tweet, which was posted during the height of the George Floyd protests, could be interpreted as criticism of the Black Lives Matter movement. Jonathan Chait wrote in New York Magazine that "At least some employees and clients on Civis Analytics complained that Shor’s tweet threatened their safety." Shor apologized for the tweet on May 29, and he was fired from Civis Analytics a few days later.

Since 2020, his work at Blue Rose Research aims to develop a data-based model to predict the outcome of future elections on the basis of simulations, designed in particular to advise the Democratic Party in campaign strategies. Shor is an advocate for what he terms "popularism", the idea that Democrats should campaign on a strategy of focusing on issues that enjoy electoral popularity, such as focusing on economic issues over polarizing social and cultural issues. Some political analysts, including Michael Podhorzer, have criticized his work for a lack of transparency regarding his methods and data sources.

References

Further reading

External links
 
 
 Website of Blue Rose Research
 "Noah Smith interviews David Shor", an hour-long interview with Bloomberg opinion writer Noah Smith

1991 births
American Orthodox Jews
American political consultants
Barack Obama 2012 presidential campaign
Data scientists
Democrats (United States)
Florida International University alumni
Living people
People from Miami
Scientists from Florida
21st-century American Jews